St. Emmeram's Cathedral is a Roman Catholic cathedral located in Nitra, Slovakia. The entire cathedral is housed in the Nitra Castle precinct, much like Prague Castle.

It was originally built in the Gothic style and is composed of many parts. The upper church dates from 1333 to 1355. The rotunda dates back to the 11th–12th century and houses a silver reliquary made in 1674. Another reliquary in the cathedral houses some relics of Saint Cyril. The lower church was built between 1621 and 1642. Later, the entire cathedral complex was remodelled in the Baroque style.

Saint Emmeram of Regensburg, to whom the cathedral is dedicated, was an itinerant seventh-century bishop who did missionary work from the court of Theodo I, Duke of Bavaria.

Jozef Tiso, who collaborated with Nazi rule in Slovakia during the Seciond World War, was reburied in the Crypt of St. Emmeram's Cathedral in 2008.

Description
Pulpit

The pulpit is part of the solid Baroque interior decoration that was commissioned by Bishop László Ádám Erdődy in the first decades of the 18th century. It was built by the left pillar of the triumphal arch, with a stone stairway leading up from the chancel. Its red, green and white marbled surface and gilt stucco decoration matches the walls and the altars. The iconography is fairly simple, with three white cherubs on the abat-voix and the Eye of Providence between clouds.

References

Roman Catholic cathedrals in Slovakia
Buildings and structures in Nitra
Gothic architecture in Slovakia
Tourist attractions in Nitra Region
Churches in Nitra
17th-century Roman Catholic church buildings in Slovakia
Roman Catholic churches completed in 1642
1642 establishments in Europe